Omega is a fictional character created by Bob Baker and Dave Martin for the British science fiction television series, Doctor Who. In the context of the series, Omega is known as one of the founders of the Time Lords of the planet Gallifrey, and is a revered figure in Time Lord history together with the equally legendary Rassilon; the Third Doctor refers to him as the Time Lords' "greatest hero". Omega first appeared in the 10th anniversary story, The Three Doctors.

The character was portrayed in The Three Doctors by Stephen Thorne and in Arc of Infinity by both Ian Collier and Fifth Doctor actor Peter Davison.

Character history
Omega was a stellar engineer and a member of the High Council on Gallifrey who developed the Hand of Omega, a remote stellar manipulator which could be used to control the reactions within a star. Using the Hand, Omega performed adjustments on a star near Gallifrey's in an attempt to provide a power source for the time travel experiments he conducted with Rassilon. However, Omega was thought to have been killed in the resulting supernova, which then collapsed into a black hole.

Rassilon subsequently captured the nucleus of the black hole and used its power to perfect time travel technology. Rassilon then took control of Gallifrey as Lord President. The nucleus eventually became known as the Eye of Harmony, and Omega's name passed into heroic legend.

Millennia later, during the events of the Doctor Who serial The Three Doctors, it was revealed that Omega had not died, but had rather been sent through the event horizon into an antimatter universe and had been trapped there since then; although he was able to shape that universe according to his will, it meant that he could not leave that universe. His exile and solitude turned him quite insane, and he sought revenge on the Time Lords for "abandoning" him. Despite the Third Doctor's assurances that he was revered among the Time Lords and still remembered fondly, Omega still sought retribution. He made two attempts in the television series to re-enter the positive matter universe: in The Three Doctors where he attempted to force the Doctor to take his place in the antimatter universe so that he could depart it, and in the serial Arc of Infinity where he attempted to create a new body for himself using the Doctor's biological data.  Both attempts were thwarted by the Doctor, with his universe being destroyed in The Three Doctors when he was tricked into touching the Second Doctor's recorder—which had remained matter when the others were converted into antimatter—and his new body was seemingly destroyed in Arc of Infinity before it could convert back to antimatter and destroy Earth.

Other appearances

Omega appears as a nemesis to the Sixth Doctor in the 1986 book Search for the Doctor (written by his co-creator Dave Martin), which was part of the Make your own adventure with Doctor Who book series (Find Your Fate in the United States) . In this book, the reader must make the right choices in order to rescue the Sixth Doctor from Omega. Dave Martin's 1982 juvenile novel K9 and the Time Trap featured a character called Omegon, whose back story and role in Time Lord history is very similar to that of Omega and who also claims to have previously met the Doctor.

In the New Adventures tie-in Doctor Who novels published in the 1990s, the partnership of Rassilon and Omega in Time Lord history is rounded off by the shadowy figure of the Other, in accordance with the storyline set up in the final years of the TV series by Andrew Cartmel. Some accounts suggest that Rassilon misled Omega into believing that he would survive the stellar experiment. The Doctor Who Monthly comic strip Star Death by Alan Moore (DWM #47) attributed the supernova to an attack by the Order of the Black Sun, an enemy of the Time Lords from 30,000 years in their future, the first strike (from the Time Lords' point of view) of a time war. The same story also identified the star as Qqaba.

Omega also appears in the 1998 BBC Books Doctor Who novel The Infinity Doctors by Lance Parkin (which also mentioned Qqaba), although as it is never quite specified if the novel takes place in the actual Doctor Who universe or an alternate reality, whether this was the "real" Omega or an alternative version is unclear. The novel reprises various events from both television appearances, although it creates an original story from them. In this story Omega exists behind a locked door inside the light-year-long space station, the Needle, which sticks out of a black hole at the end of the universe. The Needle was formed from the remains of a TARDIS originally owned by the Time Lord Savar, who had been trying to rescue Omega from the anti-matter universe. However, once Savar arrived, Omega offered him his heart's desire. Savar panicked and tried to leave, but his TARDIS could not escape. Savar abandoned it in an escape unit. From the Needle, Omega learns how to create and control "the effect", a space-time anomaly that allows him to rewrite history. The novel also established the existence of Omega's wife, who after his accident became the Doctor's wife and the mother of his thirteen children. After she was shot in the matter universe (in Parkin's Virgin Missing Adventures novel Cold Fusion), Omega rescued her and brought her to his universe.

The 2003 audio play Omega featured Omega as a central character and revealed that Omega's real name was Peylix, Omega being the grade he received at the Time Lord Academy for writing a theory about time in his exam paper that his examiner disagreed with—the lowest possible grade—which stuck to him as a cruel nickname. This story also gives one of many accounts of Omega's entrapment in the antimatter universe; he uses the amputated hand of Vandekirian, a colleague opposed to Omega's plans as the system he is targeting for destruction contains sentient life, to launch his stellar manipulator. The result is an impurity in the fusion reactor which causes Omega's ship to explode, consigning him to his anti-matter prison. However, in addition to issues concerning the canonicity of the spin-off media and the fact that in most media, Time Lord society was founded after the supposed death of Omega, the story is largely told from the point of view of an insane Omega with confused memories.  This makes the accuracy of this information uncertain.

In Chris Roberson's short story "Annus Mirabilis" from the second volume of Tales of the Shadowmen in 2005, it is strongly indicated that the French science fiction character Doctor Omega is the First Doctor, with him assuming the name Omega as a reference to Omega the Time Lord.

In the 50th Anniversary Special, the location of "The Moment", a powerful weapon, is stored on Gallifrey in the Omega Arsenal which was created by Omega himself.

In February 2015, Omega returned in audio play Gallifrey: Intervention Earth, played once again by Stephen Thorne. Here, he manipulates the Adherents of Ohm, a cult that worshipped him as a god, into ensuring his return. He possesses one of their members, Taurus, played by Daniel Brocklebank, and returns to Gallifrey. The follow up release, Enemy Lines, does not feature Omega, but does reveal his return heralded a devastating war, which is erased by these events.

On 24 October 2015, Bob Baker and Paul Tams announced the film K9: TimeQuake; this was planned for release in cinemas in 2017 to feature K-9 facing off against Omega in deep space. However, as of 2020 this movie remains in development.

In 2021 the limited series comic book Omega debuted, which depicted the character in a story that acts as a prequel to The Three Doctors and Underworld, two of the Doctor Who serials written by Bob Baker and Dave Martin.

List of appearances

References

External links

Television characters introduced in 1972
Time Lords
Omega
Doctor Who audio characters
Extraterrestrial supervillains
Male characters in television